Martijn Barto (born 23 August 1984) is a Dutch footballer who plays as a striker for Blauw Wit '34 in the Eerste Klasse.

Club career
He formerly played professional football for RKC Waalwijk and Helmond Sport. After he had played four years for amateur side Harkemase Boys, he returned in professional football in July 2011, when he signed a two-year deal with SC Cambuur. Barto won the Eerste Divisie title with the club in May 2013 and thus returned to the Eredivisie after having played there eight years earlier. In May 2016, he suffered relegation with Cambuur from the Eredivisie.

In the 2018–19 season he went to play for ONS Sneek in the Derde Divisie. Ahead of the 2019–20 season, he moved to CVV Blauw Wit '34 in the Eerste Klasse.

Coaching career
As of 1 January 2019, Barto worked as a part-time coach at the youth academy and he is involved in commercial and social affairs within SC Cambuur.

Before the 2019–20 season, as a player of CVV Blauw Wit '34, he would also be active as an assistant coach of the first team. [2] Additionally, he joined the Cambuur first-team staff, where he would work part-time as a striker coach in addition to his part-time work in the youth academy and the commercial department.

Honours

Club
Cambuur
Eerste Divisie: 2012–13

References

External links
 Voetbal International profile 

1984 births
Living people
People from Spijkenisse
Association football forwards
Dutch footballers
RKC Waalwijk players
Helmond Sport players
SC Cambuur players
Eerste Divisie players
Eredivisie players
VV Spijkenisse players
ONS Sneek players
Harkemase Boys players
Derde Divisie players
Eerste Klasse players
Footballers from South Holland